Kayabaşı is a village in the Bitlis District of Bitlis Province in Turkey. Its population is 102 (2021).

References

Villages in Bitlis District